Raghuvir Singh Shastri (5 December 1917 – 29 September 1982) was an Indian politician. He was elected to the Lok Sabha, the lower house of the Parliament of India from the Baghpat, Uttar Pradesh.

Shastri died in Delhi on 29 September 1982, at the age of 64.

References

External links
 Official biographical sketch in Lok Sabha website

1917 births
1982 deaths
Bharatiya Jana Sangh politicians
India MPs 1967–1970
Lok Sabha members from Uttar Pradesh